The 2009–10 Andebol 1 was the 59th season of Portuguese premier handball league. It ran from 12 September 2009 to 5 June 2010. Porto won their fifteenth title and the second consecutive season.

Teams

The 12 teams contesting the 2009–10 Andebol 1 season were:

League table

First group

Second round

Group A - Champion

Group B - Relegation

Top three goalscorers

References

Handball in Portugal
2009–10 domestic handball leagues
2009 in Portuguese sport
2010 in Portuguese sport